The Heart's Cry is a 1994 Burkinabé/French drama film directed by Idrissa Ouedraogo.

Plot
Moctar is a young boy who, although born in France, has grown up in Mali. At the age of eleven, he moves with his family to live in Paris. Moctar struggles to adjust to life in France, and is homesick for Africa. He begins to see visions of a hyena in the street. When he tells people, nobody believes him. He is laughed at by his schoolmates and sent to the school psychologist. He meets a man in the street called Paulo who helps Moctar to understand his visions.

Cast
Richard Bohringer as Paulo
Saïd Diarra as Moctar
Félicité Wouassi as Saffi
Alex Descas as Ibrahim Sow
Clémentine Célarié as Deborah
Jean-Yves Gautier as Paul Guerin
Cheik Doukouré as Mamadou
Adama Ouédraogo as Adama
Ginette Fabet as Firmine
Adama Kouyaté as Grandfather
Valérie Gil as Miss Romand
Grégoire Le Du as Olivier

Reception
It won the OCIC Award - Honorable Mention at the 1994 Venice Film Festival.

References

External links

 

1994 films
1994 drama films
Films directed by Idrissa Ouedraogo
French drama films
1990s French-language films
Burkinabé drama films
1990s French films